As-Siddig Al-Muntaser (also spelled Al-Seddik Al-Muntasser, or Saddiq Muntasser) (1912–1979) was a Libyan politician that held many senior positions in the era of the Kingdom of Libya (1951-1969) including the Governor of Tripolitania (he is most remembered for that) and the Minister of Defense, he was an ambassador of the Kingdom of Libya to the United States of America and the first ambassador of Libya to the United Nations, he also served as an ambassador to both Egypt and Germany at different times.

References

1912 births
1979 deaths
Ambassadors of Libya to the United States
Ambassadors of Libya to Egypt
Defence ministers of Libya

Libya and the United Nations
Libyan officials of the United Nations
Permanent Representatives of Libya to the United Nations